Sanneke Vermeulen (born 26 July 1992) is a Dutch Paralympic judoka. She represented the Netherlands at the 2008 Summer Paralympics in Beijing, China and she won one of the bronze medals in the women's 70 kg event.

References

External links 
 

Living people
1992 births
Place of birth missing (living people)
Dutch female judoka
Judoka at the 2008 Summer Paralympics
Medalists at the 2008 Summer Paralympics
Paralympic bronze medalists for the Netherlands
Paralympic medalists in judo
21st-century Dutch women